Jarret Lee Stoll (born June 24, 1982) is a Canadian former professional ice hockey player. He played in the National Hockey League (NHL) for the Edmonton Oilers, Los Angeles Kings, New York Rangers and Minnesota Wild.

Stoll is a two-time Stanley Cup champion, winning with Los Angeles in 2012 and 2014. He is currently part of the player development department for the Kings.

Playing career

Minor
Stoll played his early minor hockey in Saskatchewan. He started in the small town of Neudorf, shortly thereafter moving on to minor hockey in Melville, and then to Yorkton, Saskatchewan. In 1997, Stoll helped the Yorkton Bantam AAA Terriers to a Western Canadian Championship. While in Yorkton, Stoll attended St. Paul's Elementary School and Sacred Heart High School. He has an older brother, Kelly, who played for the Yorkton Terriers of the Saskatchewan Junior Hockey League (SJHL), and a younger sister Ashley, who played for the University of Saskatchewan Huskies women's hockey team.

After winning the bantam championship, Stoll moved on to play for the Saskatoon Blazers of the Saskatchewan Midget Triple A Hockey League. While in Saskatoon, Stoll attended St. Joseph High School. Prior to joining the Blazers, Stoll was the first overall pick of the 1997 WHL Bantam Draft by the Edmonton Ice.

Junior
Stoll started his Western Hockey League (WHL) career at the end of the 1997–98 season with the Ice, while they were still located in Edmonton. After this season, the team relocated to Cranbrook, British Columbia, and were renamed the Kootenay Ice. He played his entire junior career with the Ice franchise. In his third season, he was named team captain. In his final junior season (2001–02), Stoll captained the Ice to a Memorial Cup championship.

While playing in Kootenay, Stoll went through the NHL draft process twice. In his initial year of eligibility, he was selected by the Calgary Flames 46th overall in the 2000 NHL Entry Draft, but was unable to come to terms with the team. The Flames arranged a trade to the Toronto Maple Leafs, who thought they had made arrangements to have a contract signed by the appropriate deadline, but their fax to NHL headquarters did not make it in time. Stoll ended up re-entering the 2002 NHL Entry Draft, where he was selected by the Edmonton Oilers 36th overall.

Also during his junior career, Stoll twice represented his country at the World Junior Hockey Championships, in 2001 and 2002, winning bronze and silver medals respectively.  In 2002, Stoll was named captain for Team Canada.

Professional

Edmonton Oilers
After completing his junior career with Kootenay, Stoll entered the Oilers system, and suited up for the Hamilton Bulldogs of the American Hockey League (AHL) in 2002–03. During the season, he received his first call-up to the Oilers and played in his first four NHL games, registering an assist as his first career point. In 2003–04, he skated with the Oilers full-time. During the lock-out season of 2004-05, Stoll returned to the AHL to play with the Edmonton Roadrunners.

Stoll resumed playing with the Oilers during the 2005–06 season. During a game against the Vancouver Canucks on February 4, 2006, Stoll set an Oilers record by winning 21 of 22 faceoffs (95.45%) taken. The 2005–06 season marked Stoll's first Stanley Cup playoffs appearance, highlighted by his game-winning goal in overtime of Game 3 of the Western Conference Quarter-finals against the Detroit Red Wings. Entering the 2007–08 season, Stoll was named one of the Oilers alternate captains for the team's road games.

Los Angeles Kings
On June 29, 2008, Stoll was traded to the Los Angeles Kings (along with Matt Greene) in exchange for Ľubomír Višňovský. On September 5, the Kings signed Stoll to a four-year contract worth $14.4 million. In 2008–09, Stoll scored 18 goals with 23 assists for 41 points. On April 22, 2012, he scored the series-winning goal in overtime to eliminate the Vancouver Canucks—the winners of the Presidents' Trophy—in Game 5 of the Western Conference Quarter-finals.

On June 11, 2012, Stoll won his first Stanley Cup with the Los Angeles Kings, their first championship in history of the franchise, against the New Jersey Devils. Subsequently, he signed a three-year, $9.75 million contract on June 25 to remain with the Kings. On June 13, 2014, Stoll won his second Stanley Cup with the Kings, in Game 5 against the New York Rangers.

New York Rangers and Minnesota Wild 
On August 10, 2015, Stoll signed as a free agent to a one-year contract with the New York Rangers. Stoll made his debut with the Rangers as the team's fourth line centre on opening night of the 2015–16 season in a 3–2 victory over the defending Stanley Cup champions, the Chicago Blackhawks, on October 7, 2015. After 29 games with the Rangers and contributing with just one goal and three points, Stoll was waived by the Rangers. On December 15, 2015, he was claimed off waivers by the Minnesota Wild.

As a free agent from the Wild at the conclusion of the season, Stoll was unable to sign an NHL contract, opting to sign a professional try-out contract ("PTO") to attend the Columbus Blue Jackets' training camp on August 30, 2016. However, he was released from his PTO on October 5, 2016. Although Stoll never officially announced his retirement, he signaled an end to his playing career by accepting a job as a talent scout for the Los Angeles Kings on December 15, 2016.

Personal life
From 2006 to 2011, Stoll hosted his annual charity golf tournament in Saskatoon, Saskatchewan, which benefits the Jarret Stoll Comfort Fund.

Stoll's Los Angeles home was featured on MTV Cribs in 2011.

In the summer of 2015, Stoll was arrested for possession of cocaine and ecstasy at a hotel in Las Vegas. He pleaded guilty to two misdemeanors in the case in June 2015.

Stoll was engaged to model and actress Rachel Hunter, and they planned to marry in August 2009, but the wedding was called off. He began a relationship with sportscaster Erin Andrews in 2012. On December 9, 2016, it was announced he and Andrews were engaged. They were married on June 24, 2017.

Career statistics

Regular season and playoffs

International

Awards and honours

References

External links
 

1982 births
Living people
Calgary Flames draft picks
Canadian expatriate ice hockey players in the United States
Canadian ice hockey centres
Canadian ice hockey coaches
Edmonton Ice players
Edmonton Oilers draft picks
Edmonton Oilers players
Hamilton Bulldogs (AHL) players
Ice hockey people from Saskatchewan
Kootenay Ice players
Los Angeles Kings coaches
Los Angeles Kings players
Minnesota Wild players
New York Rangers players
Sportspeople from Melville, Saskatchewan
Sportspeople from Yorkton
Stanley Cup champions